Three ships in the United States Navy have been named USS Cayuga for one of the six Iroquois tribes.

  was a screw steamer launched in 1861 and served during the American Civil War.
 The tug , acquired by the Navy in 1898, was renamed USS Cayuga in 1917 and served under that name until sold in 1928. As Cayuga, she was later assigned hull number YT-12.
  was an amphibious ship launched in 1969 and decommissioned in 1994.

Other uses
  was an LST-491-class tank landing ship built for the United States Navy during World War II.

Fictional ships
 A destroyer named USS Cayuga has appeared as a location in the fictional television show JAG. Her part is played by the guided-missile destroyer .

United States Navy ship names